Kamphaeng Phet is a province in upper central Thailand. Kamphaeng Phet has the Ping River flow through is main river of the province, making river flats make up much of the east of the province, while the west is mountainous which is part of Dawna Range and it covered with plentifully forest. Kamphaeng Phet known its natural beauty and has a long history, its many important places such as Kamphaeng Phet Historical Park, Khlong Lan National Park, and Mae Wong National Park.

Toponymy
In Thai or Lao kamphaeng means 'wall' and phet (from Sanskrit vájra) means 'diamond'. The name means 'wall as hard as diamond'. This wall served as a defensive line to protect the Ayutthaya Kingdom from what is now modern-day Burma. The old name was Khao Kampeng, referring to a 'mountain wall' between the two countries.

Geography
The main river is the Ping, a major tributary of the Chao Phraya River. River flats make up much of the east of the province, while the west is mountainous and covered with forests.

One of the provinces best-known products is bananas, especially the kluai khai, a small, round, sweet banana. Banana festivals are held every year to thank the spirits for the harvest.

National parks
There area three national parks make up region 12 (Nakhon Sawan) of Thailand's protected areas.
 Mae Wong National Park, 
 Khlong Wang Chao National Park, 
 Khlong Lan National Park,

Wildlife sanctuary
 Khao Sanam Phriang Wildlife Sanctuary,

History
Kamphaeng Phet was already a royal city in the Sukhothai Kingdom in the 14th century, then known under its old name Chakangrao. It formed an important part of the defence system of the kingdom, as well as of the later Ayutthaya Kingdom.

Symbols
The provincial seal shows the city walls surmounted by diamonds, since the city name means 'diamond wall' (from the shape of the ramparts of the old city wall). The provincial tree is the areca nut palm (Acacia catechu), and the provincial flower the bullet wood (Mimusops elengi). Golden belly barb (Hypsibarbus wetmorei) is provincial fish, since it is a fish found in the Ping river especially in the area of Kamphaeng Phet.

Administrative divisions

Provincial government
The province is divided into 11 districts (amphoes). These are further divided into 78 subdistricts (tambons) and 823 villages (mubans).

Local government
As of 26 November 2019 there are: one Kamphaeng Phet Provincial Administration Organisation and 25 municipal (thesaban) areas in the province. Kamphaeng Phet, Pang Makha and Nong Pling have town (thesaban mueang) status. Further 22 subdistrict municipalities (thesaban tambon). The non-municipal areas are administered by 64 Subdistrict Administrative Organisations - SAO (ongkan borihan suan tambon).

Human achievement index 2017

Since 2003, United Nations Development Programme (UNDP) in Thailand has tracked progress on human development at sub-national level using the Human achievement index (HAI), a composite index covering all the eight key areas of human development. National Economic and Social Development Board (NESDB) has taken over this task since 2017.

Notable residents
Saman Sorjaturong: WBC & IBF light flyweight world champion
Kaeo Pongprayoon: 2012 Summer Olympics silver medalist

Gallery

References

External links 

 Provincial page from the Tourist Authority of Thailand

 Website of province (Thai)

 
Provinces of Thailand